Ihor Troianovskyi (born 9 August 2002) is a Ukrainian swimmer. He competed in the 2020 Summer Olympics.

References

2002 births
Living people
Sportspeople from Odesa
Sportspeople from Kyiv
Swimmers at the 2020 Summer Olympics
Ukrainian male swimmers
Olympic swimmers of Ukraine
Swimmers at the 2018 Summer Youth Olympics